The Boat Race is an annual set of rowing races between the Cambridge University Boat Club and the Oxford University Boat Club, traditionally rowed between open-weight eights on the River Thames in London, England. There are separate men's and women's races, as well as races for reserve crews. It is also known as the University Boat Race and the Oxford and Cambridge Boat Race.  The men's race was first held in 1829 and has been held annually since 1856, except during the First and Second World Wars (although unofficial races were conducted) and the COVID-19 pandemic in 2020. The first women's event was in 1927 and the race has been held annually since 1964. Since 2015, the women's race has taken place on the same day and course, and since 2018 the combined event of the two races has been referred to as the Boat Race.

The Championship Course has hosted the vast majority of the races.  It covers a  stretch of the Thames in West London, from Putney to Mortlake.  Other locations have been used, including a stretch of the River Great Ouse which was the venue for the 2021 race.  Members of both crews are traditionally known as blues and each boat as a "Blue Boat", with Cambridge in light blue and Oxford in dark blue. As of 2022, Cambridge has won the men's race 85 times and Oxford 81 times, with one dead heat, and has led Oxford in cumulative wins since 1930. In the women's race, Cambridge have won the race 45 times and Oxford 30 times, and has led Oxford in cumulative wins since 1966. A reserve boat race has been held since 1965 for the men and since 1966 for the women.

In most years over 250,000 people watch the race from the banks of the river. In 2009, a record 270,000 people watched the race live. A further 15 million or more watch it on television.

History of the men's race

Origin

The tradition was started in 1829 by Charles Merivale, a student at St John's College, Cambridge, and his Old Harrovian school friend Charles Wordsworth who was studying at Christ Church, Oxford. The University of Cambridge challenged the University of Oxford to a race at Henley-on-Thames but lost easily. Oxford raced in dark blue because five members of the crew, including the stroke, were from Christ Church, then Head of the River, whose colours were dark blue.

The second race was in 1836, with the venue moved to a course from Westminster to Putney. Over the next two years, there was disagreement over where the race should be held, with Oxford preferring Henley and Cambridge preferring London. Following the official formation of the Oxford University Boat Club, racing between the two universities resumed  in 1839 on the Tideway and the tradition continues to the present day, with the loser challenging the winner to a rematch annually.

Since 1856, the race has been held every year, except for the years 1915 to 1919 due to World War I, 1940 to 1945, due to World War II, and in 2020 due to the COVID-19 pandemic.

1877 dead heat

The race in 1877 was declared a dead heat. Both crews finished in a time of 24minutes and 8seconds in bad weather. The verdict of the race judge, John Phelps, is considered suspect because he was reportedly over 70 and blind in one eye. Rowing historian Tim Koch, writing in the official 2014 Boat Race Programme, notes that there is "a very big and very entrenched lie" about the race, including the claim that Phelps had announced "Dead heat... to Oxford by six feet" (the distance supposedly mentioned by Phelps varies according to the telling).

Phelps's nickname "Honest John" was not an ironic one, and he was not (as is sometimes claimed) drunk under a bush at the time of the finish. He did have to judge who had won without the assistance of finish posts (which were installed in time for the next year's race). Some newspapers had believed Oxford won a narrow victory but their viewpoint was from downstream; Phelps considered that the boats were essentially level with each surging forward during the stroke cycle. With no clear way to determine who had surged forward at the exact finish line, Phelps could only pronounce it a dead heat. Koch believes that the press and Oxford supporters made up the stories about Phelps later, which Phelps had no chance to refute.

Cancellations during World Wars 

Because of World War I and II, the race was not held in 1915–1919 and 1940–1945. On 12 January 1915, The Daily Telegraph announced that the annual race was cancelled due to men leaving for war, "for every available oarsman, either Fresher or Blue, has joined the colours."

1959 Oxford mutiny

In 1959 some of the existing Oxford blues attempted to oust president Ronnie Howard and coach Jumbo Edwards. However, their attempt failed when Cambridge supported the president.  Three of the dissidents returned and Oxford went on to win by six lengths.

1987 Oxford mutiny

Following defeat in the previous year's race, Oxford's first in eleven years, American Chris Clark was determined to gain revenge: "Next year we're gonna kick ass ... Cambridge's ass. Even if I have to go home and bring the whole US squad with me."  He recruited another four American post-graduates: three international-class rowers (Dan Lyons, Chris Huntington and Chris Penny) and a cox (Jonathan Fish), in an attempt to put together the fastest Boat Race crew in the history of the contest.

Disagreements over the training regime of Dan Topolski, the Oxford coach ("He wanted us to spend more time training on land than water!", lamented Lyons), led to the crew walking out on at least one occasion, and resulted in the coach revising his approach. A fitness test between Clark and club president Donald Macdonald (in which Clark triumphed) resulted in a call for Macdonald's removal; it was accompanied with a threat that the Americans would refuse to row should Macdonald remain in the crew. As boat club president, Macdonald "had absolute power over selection", and when he announced that Clark would row on starboard, his weaker side, Macdonald would row on the port side and Tony Ward was to be dropped from the crew entirely, the American contingent mutinied.  After considerable negotiation and debate, much of it conducted in the public eye, Clark, Penny, Huntington, Lyons and Fish were dropped and replaced by members of Oxford's reserve crew, Isis.

The race was won by Oxford by fourlengths, despite Cambridge being favourites.

In 1989 Topolski and author Patrick Robinson's book about the events, True Blue: The Oxford Boat Race Mutiny, was published. Seven years later, a film based on the book was released. Alison Gill, the then-president of the Oxford University Women's Boat Club, wrote The Yanks at Oxford, in which she defended the Americans and claimed Topolski wrote True Blue in order to justify his own actions. River and Rowing Museum founder Chris Dodd described True Blue as "particularly offensive" yet also wrote "[Oxford] lacked the power, the finesse—basically everything the pre-mutiny line-up had going for it."

2012 disruption

In the 2012 race, after almost three-quarters of the course had been rowed, the race was halted for over 30 minutes when a lone protester, Australian Trenton Oldfield, entered the water from Chiswick Eyot and deliberately swam between the boats near Chiswick Pier with the intention of protesting against spending cuts, and what he saw as the erosion of civil liberties and a growing culture of elitism within British society. Once he was spotted by assistant umpire Sir Matthew Pinsent, both boats were required to stop for safety reasons.  Once restarted, the boats clashed and the oar of Oxford crewman Hanno Wienhausen was broken in half with the blade snapped off. The race umpire John Garrett judged the clash to be Oxford's fault and allowed the race to continue. Cambridge quickly took the lead and went on to win the race. The Oxford crew entered a final appeal to the umpire which was quickly rejected; and Cambridge were confirmed as winners in the first race since 1849 that a crew had won the boat race without an official recorded winning time. After the end of the race Oxford's bow man, Alex Woods, received emergency treatment after collapsing in the boat from exhaustion. Because of the circumstances, the post-race celebrations by the winning Cambridge crew were unusually muted and the planned award ceremony was cancelled.

2020 cancellation

Like other sports events, the 2020 boat race was cancelled because of the COVID-19 pandemic.

2021 relocation

This was due to the safety issues of Hammersmith Bridge, as well as restrictions due to the COVID-19 pandemic still being in force.

The 2022 Boat Race returned to the Thames and the traditional course between Putney and Mortlake.

Sinkings
In the 1912 race, run in extremely poor weather and high winds, both crews sank. Oxford rowed into a significant early lead, but began taking on water, and made for the bank shortly after passing Hammersmith Bridge to empty the boat out: although they attempted to restart, the race was abandoned at this point because Cambridge had also sunk while passing the Harrods Depository.

Cambridge also sank in 1859 and in 1978, while Oxford did so in 1925, and again in 1951; the 1951 race was re-rowed on the following Monday. In 1984 the Cambridge boat sank after colliding with a barge before the start of the race, which was then rescheduled for the next day. In 2016, at Barnes Bridge, Cambridge women began to sink but gradually recovered to complete the race.

History of the women's race
From the first women's event in 1927, the Women's Boat Race was run separately from the men's event until 2015. There was significant inequality between the two events. Changes in recent years, arising significantly from the sponsorship of Newton Investment Management, have made the two races more equal: both events have been held together on The Tideway since 2015, and there are new training facilities for the women, comparable to those of the men, since 2016.

Courses
The 1st Boat Race took place at Henley-on-Thames in 1829 but the event was subsequently officially held along the Thames, mostly the Championship Course, until the 2021 race which was moved to the River Great Ouse both due the COVID-19 pandemic and safety concerns under Hammersmith Bridge.  Unofficial races were held during the Second World War at various locations.

The Championship Course

The Championship Course is 4 miles and 374 yards (6.779 km) from Putney to Mortlake, passing Hammersmith and Barnes, following an S shape, east to west. The start and finish are marked by the University Boat Race Stones on the south bank. The clubs' presidents toss a coin (the 1829 sovereign) before the race for the right to choose which side of the river (station) they will row on: their decision is based on the weather, the speed of the flood tide, and how the three bends in the course might favour their crew's pace. The north station ('Middlesex') has the advantage of the first and last bends, and the south ('Surrey') station the other, longer bend.

During the race the coxes compete for the fastest current, which lies at the deepest part of the river, frequently leading to clashes of blades and warnings from the umpire. A crew that gets a lead of more than a boat's length can cut in front of their opponent, making it extremely difficult for the trailing crew to gain the lead. For this reason the tactics of the race are generally to go fast early on, and it is unusual for the leading crew to change after halfway (though this happened in 2003, 2007 and 2010).

Save for three Victorian instances, each race is rowed westwards, but starts during the incoming (known as flood) tide, so that the crews are rowing with, not against, the fast stream. At the conclusion of the race, the boats come ashore at the shared shingle of the two boat clubs in Chiswick, a few metres west of Chiswick Bridge. Here, shortly after the race, the Boat Race trophy is presented to the winning crew. It is traditional for the winning side to throw their cox into the Thames to celebrate their achievement.

Unofficial courses
In addition, there were four unofficial boat races held during the Second World War away from London. None of those competing were awarded blues, and these races are not included in the official list:
1940, 1945 – Henley-on-Thames 
1943 – Sandford-on-Thames
1944 – River Great Ouse, Ely: Littleport to Queen Adelaide

Women's Boat Race courses
During its early years (1927 to 1976 with several gaps) the Women's Boat Race alternated between The Isis in Oxford and the River Cam in Cambridge over a distance of about 1,000 yards. On two occasions, in 1929 and 1935, the race was held on the Tideway in London. Unlike the men's race, the official women's race continued in most years through the Second World War.

From 1977 to 2014, the Women's Boat Race was usually held on a 2000-metre course as part of the Henley Boat Races. However in 2013 the entire Henley Boat Races were moved to Dorney Lake due to rough water at Henley. In 2021, the race was held on the River Great Ouse from Ely, Cambridgeshire along with the men's race.

Media coverage
The race first appeared in a short film of the 1895 race entitled "The Oxford and Cambridge University Boat Race", directed and produced by Birt Acres. Consisting of a single shot of around a minute, it was the first film to be commercially screened in the UK outside London.  The event is now a British national institution, and is televised live each year. The women's race has received television coverage and grown in popularity since 2015, attracting a television audience of 4.8 million viewers that year.  BBC Television first covered the men's race in 1938, the BBC having covered it on radio since 1927. For the 2005 to 2009 races, the BBC lost the television rights to ITV, after 66 years, but it returned to the corporation in 2010.  Ethnographer Mark de Rond described the training, selection, and victory of the 2007 Cambridge crew in The Last Amateurs: To Hell and Back with the Cambridge Boat Race Crew.

Competitors

Men's race

Many notable individuals have participated in the Boat Race, including those of an Olympic standard.  Four-time Olympic gold medallist Sir Matthew Pinsent, rowed for Oxford in 1990, 1991, and 1993. Olympic gold medallists from 2000 – James Cracknell (Cambridge 2019), Tim Foster (Oxford 1997), Luka Grubor (Oxford 1997), Andrew Lindsay (Oxford 1997, 1998, 1999) and Kieran West (Cambridge 1999, 2001, 2006, 2007), 2004 – Ed Coode (Oxford 1998), and 2008 – Jake Wetzel (Oxford 2006) and Malcolm Howard (Oxford 2013, 2014) have also rowed for their university.

Other famous participants include Andrew Irvine (Oxford 1922, 1923), Lord Snowdon (Cambridge 1950), Colin Moynihan (Oxford 1977), actor Hugh Laurie (Cambridge 1980), TV presenter Dan Snow (Oxford 1999, 2000, 2001) and Conspicuous Gallantry Cross recipient Robin Bourne-Taylor (Oxford 2001, 2002, 2003, 2005).

Academic status
Oxford University does not offer sport scholarships at entry; student-athletes are not admitted differently to any other students and must meet the academic requirements of the university, with sport having a neutral effect on any application. Likewise, bursaries and scholarship opportunities for athletes at the University of Cambridge are only open to those students who have already been admitted to the University on academic merit.

In order to protect the status of the race as a competition between genuine students, the Cambridge University Blues Committee in July 2007 refused to award a blue to 2006 and 2007 Cambridge oarsman Thorsten Engelmann, as he did not complete his academic course and instead returned to the German national rowing team to prepare for the Beijing Olympics. This has caused a debate about a change of rules, and one suggestion is that only students who are enrolled in courses lasting at least two years should be eligible to race.

Standard of the men's crews

According to British Olympic gold medallist Martin Cross, Boat Race crews of the early 1980s were viewed as "a bit of a joke" by some international-level rowers of the time. However, their standard has improved substantially since then.  In 2007 Cambridge were entered in the London Head of the River Race, where they should have been measured directly against the best crews in Britain and beyond. However the event was called off after several crews were sunk or swamped in rough conditions. Cambridge were fastest of the few crews who did complete the course.

Sponsorship
Men's race
The Boat Race has been sponsored since 1976, with the money spent mainly on equipment and travel during the training period. The sponsors do not have their logos on the boats, but now tend to have their logo on kit during the race. They also provide branded training gear and have some naming rights. Boat Race sponsors have included Ladbrokes, Beefeater Gin, Aberdeen Asset Management, and the business process outsourcing company Xchanging for a few years until 2012. Since 2010 the deal has included the crews agreeing to wear the logo on their race kit for more funding. Prior to this, all sponsorship marks had been scrupulously discarded on boating for the competition, on amateurist, ‘Corinthian’ values but perhaps also as before televised races a single sponsor for both crews was unlikely. The sponsor has extended to being a "title sponsor" (titular, official race name) since such a longer name of the race was founded in 2010, the first three of which thus becoming The Xchanging Boat Race.

In 2013 the sponsor BNY Mellon took over and it became the BNY Mellon Boat Race. From 2016 to 2018, BNY Mellon and Newton Investment management donated the title sponsorship to Cancer Research UK.

Women's race
The Women's Boat Race 2011 was the first to be sponsored by Newton Investment Management, a subsidiary of BNY Mellon. Previously the crews had no sponsorship and were self funded. Newton have remained the sponsor since then and increased the amount of funding significantly.

The Boat Races

In 2021 the Men's and Women's Boat Races came under the same sponsorship for the first time. Gemini, a cryptocurrency exchange founded by 2010 Oxford Blues Cameron and Tyler Winklevoss, took over as title sponsor and it became the Gemini Boat Race.

Other boat races involving Oxford and Cambridge

Although the Boat Race crews are the best-known, the universities both field reserve crews. The reserves race takes place on the same day as the main race. The Oxford men's reserve crew is called Isis (after the Isis, a section of the River Thames which passes through Oxford), and the Cambridge reserve men's crew is called Goldie (the name comes from rower and Boat Club president John Goldie, 1849–1896, after whom the Goldie Boathouse is named). The women's reserve crews are Osiris (Oxford) and Blondie (Cambridge). A veterans' boat race, usually held on a weekday before the main Boat Race, takes place on the Thames between Putney and Hammersmith.

The two universities also field lightweight men's and women's crews. These squads race each other in eights as part of the Lightweight Boat Races. The first men's race took place in 1975, being joined by a women's race in 1984. Both races are currently held on the 4.2-mile (6.8 km) Championship Course from Putney to Mortlake, although they previously formed part of the Henley Boat Races, along with various other rowing races between the two universities including the openweight women's Boat Race until 2015. Competitors in the event have gone on to compete at international and Olympic levels, as well as represent their universities at openweight level. For the men's race the average weight of the crew must be 70 kg (154.3 lb / 11 st 0.3 lb), with no rower weighing over 72.5 kg (159.8 lb / 11 st 5.8 lb). For the women's race no rower can exceed 59 kg (130.0 lb / 9 st 4 lb). At Oxford, both the men's and women's lightweight boats are awarded a full blue. At Cambridge the women's boat is awarded a full blue, whereas the men's boat receives a half-blue.

In popular culture 
Boat race became such a popular phrase that it was incorporated into Cockney rhyming slang, for "face".

In the stories of P. G. Wodehouse, several characters allude to Boat Race night as a time of riotous celebration (presumably after the victory of the character's alma mater). This frequently sees the participants in trouble with the authorities. In Piccadilly Jim, it is mentioned that Lord Datchett was thrown out of the Empire Music Hall every year on Boat Race night while he was an undergraduate. Bertie Wooster mentions he is "rather apt to let myself go a bit" on Boat Race night and several times describes being fined five pounds at "Bosher Street" (possibly a reference to Bow Street Magistrates' Court) for stealing a policeman's helmet one year; the beginning of the first episode of the television series Jeeves and Wooster shows his court appearance on this occasion. In the short story Jeeves and the Chump Cyril, he describes having to repeatedly bail out of jail a friend who is arrested every year on Boat Race night.

In Missee Lee by Arthur Ransome (one of the Swallows and Amazons series of children's books) Captain Flint (who had dropped out of Oxford) tells Missee Lee he was in gaol once on Boat-race night. High spirits. A fancy for policemen's helmets. When Missee Lee says Camblidge won and evellybody happy he replies Not that year, ma'am. We were the happy ones that year.  In the Jennings books by Anthony Buckeridge the protagonist's teacher Mr Wilkins is a former Cambridge rowing blue.

The 1969 film The Magic Christian features the Boat Race, as Sir Guy makes use of the Oxford crew in one of his elaborate pranks.

Actor and comedian Matt Berry wrote and narrated an irreverent, alternative history of the Boat Race for the BBC in 2015.

Statistics 

Men's race
Number of wins: Cambridge, 85; Oxford, 80 (1 dead heat)
Most consecutive victories: Cambridge, 13 (1924–36)
Course record: Cambridge, 1998 – 16 min 19 sec; average speed 
Narrowest winning margin, excluding the dead heat: 1 foot (Oxford, 2003)
Largest winning margin: 35 lengths (Cambridge, 1839)

Reserve wins: Cambridge (Goldie), 29; Oxford (Isis), 24

Women's race
Number of wins: Cambridge, 45; Oxford, 30
Course record: Cambridge, 2022 – 18 min 22 sec (faster, in different conditions, than the Cambridge men's Blue Boat in 2016 and the Oxford men's in 2014)
Reserve wins: Cambridge (Blondie), 27; Oxford (Osiris), 20

Results

Men's race

There have been 167 official races in 192 years.

Source:

Women's race
There have been 75 races in 94 years.

See also 
Oxford–Cambridge rivalry
The Boat Race of the North – a similar event in Northern England between Durham University and Newcastle University
Harvard–Yale Regatta – A similar event in the United States between Harvard University and Yale University
Scottish Boat Race – a similar event in Scotland between University of Glasgow and University of Edinburgh
Varsity match
The Welsh Boat Race – a similar event in Wales between Swansea University and Cardiff University
York and Lancaster Universities Roses Race - a boat race between University of York and Lancaster University.

Notes

References

External links 

 
 Watch the 2007 Boat Race
 The Boat Race course visualization on Google Earth/Maps 

 
1829 establishments in England
Annual events in London
Mortlake, London
Putney
Recurring sporting events established in 1829
Rowing on the River Thames
Regattas on the River Thames
University rowing competitions in the United Kingdom